Tecate is a municipality in the Mexican state of Baja California. Its municipal seat is located in the city of Tecate. According to the 2020 census, it had a population of 108,440 inhabitants. The municipality has an area of 3,079.0 km² (1,188.8 sq mi).

Boroughs
The municipality is administratively subdivided into 6 boroughs, in addition to the municipal seat, Tecate.
 Nueva Colonia Hindú
 Colonia Luis Echeverría
 Heroes del Desierto
 Mi Ranchito
 Valle de Las Palmas
 La Rumorosa

Demographics

As of 2020, the municipality had a total population of 108,440.

As of 2010, the city of Tecate had a population of 64,764. Other than the city of Tecate, the municipality had 964 localities, the largest of which (with 2010 populations in parentheses) were: Lomas de Santa Anita (6,604), Nueva Colonia Hindú (4,431), classified as urban, and Cereso del Hongo (4,278), Luis Echeverría Álvarez (El Hongo) (2,411), classified as urban, and Hacienda Tecate (1,871), Valle de las Palmas (1,860), La Rumorosa (1,836), Maclovio Herrera (Colonia Aviación) (1,219), Alfonso Garzón (Granjas Familiares) (1,188), and El Mirador (1,171), classified as rural.

Adjacent municipalities and counties
 Mexicali Municipality – east
 Ensenada Municipality – south
 Tijuana Municipality – west
 San Diego County, California – north
 Imperial County, California – northeast

References

 Link to tables of population data from 2010 Census, INEGI: Instituto Nacional de Estadística, Geografía e Informática.
 Tecate, Enciclopedia de los Municipios de México, Instituto Nacional Para el Federalismo y el Desarrollo Municipal, SEGOB.  Accessed on line November 15, 2007.

External links

 Gobierno Municipal de Tecate, Baja California Official government website.

 
Municipalities of Baja California